Vasilije Šijaković (Montenegrin Cyrillic: Bacилиje Шиjaкoвић; 31 July 1929 – 10 November 2003) was a Montenegrin footballer. He played at two World Cup Finals tournaments for Yugoslavia.

Club career
At club level, he played for the major domestic clubs, FK Partizan, BSK Belgrade (OFK), Red Star Belgrade and French Grenoble Foot 38.

International career
Šijaković made his debut for Yugoslavia in a November 1957 FIFA World Cup qualification match against Romania and has earned a total of 11 caps, scoring no goals. His final international was a June 1962 FIFA World Cup Finals match against Czechoslovakia.

References

External links

Profile on Serbian federation official site

1929 births
2003 deaths
Footballers from Nikšić
Association football defenders
Yugoslav footballers
Yugoslavia international footballers
1958 FIFA World Cup players
1962 FIFA World Cup players
FK Partizan players
Red Star Belgrade footballers
OFK Beograd players
Grenoble Foot 38 players
Yugoslav First League players
Yugoslav Second League players
Ligue 1 players
Yugoslav expatriate footballers
Expatriate footballers in France
Yugoslav expatriate sportspeople in France
Yugoslav football managers
FK Sutjeska Nikšić managers